NBC 11 may refer to one of the following television stations in the United States:

Current affiliates
KCBD in Lubbock, Texas
KGIN-DT2 in Grand Island, Nebraska
KKCO in Grand Junction, Colorado
KNTV in San Jose, California (O&O)
KRII in Chisholm, Minnesota
Semi-satellite of KBJR-TV in Superior, Wisconsin / Duluth, Minnesota
KSNG in Garden City, Kansas
Semi-satellite of KSNW in Wichita, Kansas
KVLY-TV in Fargo, North Dakota
KYMA-DT in Yuma, Arizona / El Centro, California
WBAL-TV in Baltimore, Maryland
WBKB-DT2, a digital subchannel of WBKB-TV in Alpena, Michigan
WXIA-TV in Atlanta, Georgia
WPXI in Pittsburgh, Pennsylvania
KARE in Minneapolis - St. Paul, Minnesota

Formerly affiliated
KHAW-TV in Hilo, Hawaii (1961 to 1996)
KYMA in Yuma, Arizona (1991 to 2020)
VSB-TV in Hamilton, Bermuda (1991 to 2014)
WLUK-TV in Green Bay, Wisconsin (1954 to 1959 and 1983 to 1995)